Akis may refer to:

A crater in the Mons Vinogradov
Aghtsk, Armenia - formerly Akis
Akis (given name)
Akis (periodical), a former periodical in Turkey
Akis (TV series), a Malaysian cartoon show
Akis (beetle), a genus of beetle in tribe Akidini

See also
 Aki (disambiguation) for the singular of the plural 'Akis'